ProMedica Flower Hospital is 311-bed non-profit hospital in Sylvania, Ohio operated by ProMedica as a division of ProMedica Toledo Hospital.

The hospital is home to the Hickman Cancer Center, an emergency department, primary stroke center, and adult impatient psychiatry services. The emergency department has 25 beds and serves approximately 30,000 patients each year.

History

In memory of his late wife, Ellen, Stevens Warren Flower took up the task of building Flower Hospital in 1910. It was originally built near his home in downtown Toledo, Ohio, but it was later relocated to Sylvania, Ohio, in 1975.

Amenities

The hospital has a cafeteria with a Subway restaurant,  two gift shops, internet access, a library, and pastoral services.

References

External links 

Hospital buildings completed in 1910
Hospital buildings completed in 1975
Hospitals in Ohio
1910 establishments in Ohio